Hinrich Lohse (2 September 1896 – 25 February 1964) was a Nazi German politician and a convicted war criminal, best known for his rule of the Reichskommissariat Ostland, during World War II. Reichskommissariat Ostland now comprises Lithuania, Latvia, Estonia, and parts of modern day Belarus.

Early life
Hinrich Lohse was born into a peasant family in the town of Mühlenbarbek in the Province of Schleswig-Holstein. From 1903 to 1912 he attended the Volksschule in his home town, and afterwards the higher trade school. In 1913 he worked as an employee at the Blohm & Voss shipyard in Hamburg. During the First World War of 1914-1918 he served in the Imperial German Army from 23 September 1915 until his discharge with war wounds on 30 October 1916.

Nazi Party career
From 1919, Lohse was first an associate at the Schleswig-Holstein Farmers' Association, and then as of 1920, general secretary of the Schleswig-Holsteinische Bauern- und Landarbeiterdemokratie. In 1923, he joined the Nazi Party and became on 27 March 1925 the NSDAP Gauleiter for Schleswig-Holstein. In 1924, as a member of the Völkisch-Sozialer Block list, he became the only Nazi to be elected to the city representative college (Stadtverordnetenkollegium) of Altona/Elbe. During this time, he led various nationally oriented farming associations in northern Germany, such as the Landvolkbewegung ("Rural People's Movement"), into the Nazi Party.

In September 1925, Lohse joined the National Socialist Working Association, a short-lived group of northern and western German Gaue, organized and led by Gregor Strasser, which unsuccessfully sought to amend the Party program. It was dissolved in 1926 following the Bamberg Conference. 

Between 3 September 1928 and 15 April 1929, Lohse also temporarily administered the Nazi Gau of Hamburg before the appointment of Karl Kaufmann as Gauleiter. On 15 July 1932, he was appointed as Landesinspekteur-North. In this position, he had oversight responsibility for his Gau and three others (Hamburg, Mecklenburg-Lubeck, and Pomerania). This was a short-lived initiative by Gregor Strasser to centralize control over the Gaue. However, it was unpopular with the Gauleiters and was repealed on Strasser's fall from power in December 1932. Lohse then returned to his Gauleiter position in Schleswig-Holstein.

Lohse was elected to the Reichstag for electoral constituency 13, Schleswig-Holstein, in November 1932. Shortly after the Nazis' seizure of power he was appointed as Oberpräsident (high president) of the Province of Schleswig-Holstein on 25 March 1933. He thus united under his control the highest party and governmental offices in the province. In 1934, he took over the chairmanship of the Nordic Association (Nordische Gesellschaft). On 1 January 1937, he was promoted to SA-Obergruppenführer. On 16 November  1942, Lohse was appointed the Reich Defense Commissioner for his Gau, as were all Gauleiters.

In the Baltic states

On 25 July 1941, after the German occupation of Baltic states from the Soviet Union, Lohse was appointed "Reichskommissar for the Ostland". Lohse retained his functions in Schleswig-Holstein and shuttled between his two seats of Riga and Kiel. As Reichskommissar for Ostland and Alfred Rosenberg's deputy, he was responsible for the implementation of Nazi Germanization policies built on the foundations of the Generalplan Ost: the killing of almost all Jews, Romani people, and Communists, and the oppression of the local population was its necessary corollary. Lohse was not directly responsible for the murderous actions of police forces and Einsatzgruppen who were under the control of SS-Brigadeführer and Generalmajor der Polizei Franz Walter Stahlecker, later on Higher SS and Police Leader (HSSPF) and even more of SS General and HSSPF Friedrich Jeckeln, the chief organizer of the Rumbula massacre.

Nevertheless, as the leader of the "civil" administration, he implemented, through a series of special edicts and guiding principles for the general settlement plan for Ostland, many of the preparatory acts that facilitated the subsequent police Aktionen (Nazi euphemism for killing operations).
In particular, he shared with Hans-Adolf Prützmann many of the responsibilities for the enslavement and ghettoization of the Jews of Latvia.

When he fled the Reichskommissariat Ostland in the autumn of 1944, and reached Schleswig-Holstein, he exercised there absolute rule as Gauleiter and Reich defense commissioner until the end of the war.

Postwar trial and life 
On 6 May 1945, Lohse was unseated as Oberpräsident of Schleswig-Holstein (by the 5 May German surrender at Lüneburg Heath) and shortly thereafter imprisoned by the British Army. (Nazi Germany itself surrendered on 7 May and was disestablished on the evening of 8 May). Lohse was sentenced in 1948 to 10 years in prison, but was released in 1951 due to illness. Two inquiries were launched by German prosecutors against him; the grant of a high-presidential pension, for which Lohse was fighting, was withdrawn under pressure from the Schleswig-Holstein Landtag. Lohse spent his twilight years in Mühlenbarbek, where he died.

See also
 New Order (Nazism)
 Nazism and race
 German occupation of the Baltic states during World War II
 German occupation of Estonia during World War II
 German occupation of Latvia during World War II
 German occupation of Lithuania during World War II
 German occupation of Byelorussia during World War II
 Forced labour under German rule during World War II

References

External links
 
 
 
The murder of Jews in the Reichskommisariat Ostland 
 

1896 births
1964 deaths
Gauleiters
German Army personnel of World War I
Heads of government who were later imprisoned
Heads of state convicted of war crimes
Holocaust perpetrators in Latvia
Holocaust perpetrators in Lithuania
Members of the Reichstag of Nazi Germany
Members of the Reichstag of the Weimar Republic
Militant League for German Culture members
National Socialist Working Association members
Nazi Party officials
Nazi Party politicians
People from Steinburg
People from the Province of Schleswig-Holstein
People of Reichskommissariat Ostland
Riga Ghetto
Schleswig-Holstein Farmers and Farmworkers Democracy politicians
Sturmabteilung personnel